Veteran is a rural residential locality in the Gympie Region, Queensland, Australia. In the  Veteran had a population of 892 people.

Geography 

The southern part of the locality is predominantly used for rural residential purposes with the northern part more used for grazing on native vegetation.

History 
In 1930 land was reserved for a School of Arts. The School of Arts Hall opened in 1932.

In the  Veteran had a population of 892 people.

Heritage listings 
Veteran has the following heritage listings:

 594 Sandy Creek Road: Veteran School of Arts Hall

Education
There are no schools in Veteran. The nearest government primary schools are Gympie East State School in neighbouring Greens Creek to the south-east, Gympie West State School in Gympie to the south-west, and Chatsworth State School in Chatsworth to the west. The nearest government secondary schools are Gympie State High School and James Nash State High School, both in Gympie.

References

Suburbs of Gympie
Localities in Queensland